The Long Island International Film Expo, founded in 1997 by Nassau County Film Office Director, Debra Markowitz. The festival generally receives between 400 and 450 submissions every year  In 2009, 170 films from 23 countries were screened at the festival. Ed Burns, director of films such as The Brothers McMullen and Newlyweds was awarded a Creative Achievement Award during the 2011 festival. The festival hosts several panels on film distribution, screenwriting, and other relevant industry topics.

Past festival attendees include Steve Buscemi (Trees Lounge, Armageddon), William Baldwin (Backdraft), Edie Falco (The Sopranos, Judy Berlin), Karen Allen (Raiders of the Lost Ark, The Perfect Storm), Ralph Macchio (The Outsiders, The Karate Kid), William Sadler (The Shawshank Redemption), Robert Vaughn (The Man from U.N.C.L.E.), Tony Lo Bianco (The French Connection), Sean Young (Blade Runner), Gianni Russo (The Godfather), Ed Burns (Saving Private Ryan), Ally Sheedy (The Breakfast Club), Cathy Moriarty (Raging Bull), Ed Asner (The Mary Tyler Moore Show, Up), Larry Romano (A Bronx Tale), Robert Clohessy (Blue Bloods), Phyllis Somerville (Little Children, The Curious Case of Benjamin Button) and others.

2011 films

 Immigrant Son: The Story of John D. Mezzogiorno
 As If I Am Not There
 Jesse
Winner: Audience Award
 Defining Beauty: Ms Wheelchair America
 For Belly
 Long Island Uncovered
 Tanzania: A Friendship Journey
Winner: Best Documentary
 Composed
 Strings
Winner: Best Director, Best Cinematography, Best Supporting Actor, Best Supporting Actress
Nominated: Best Feature Film, Best Story
 Fordson: Faith, Fasting, Football
 True to the Heart
Winner: Best First Feature, Best Actor, Best Actress
 Quirk of Fate
Winner: Best Art Direction
 John Muir: In the New World
 The Test
 Beatboxing - The Fifth Element of Hip Hop
 Romeows (Retired Older Men Eating Out Wednesdays)
 Come Hell or High Water
 King of the Hamptons

2020 edition
The 2020 edition of the festival, which was originally scheduled to take place from July 10–16, 2020, was postponed to September 30-October 8, 2020 due to the COVID-19 pandemic. The opening and closing nights, along with select screening blocks and the awards ceremony, took place virtually, while some blocks were presented as drive-in screenings at the Samanea New York Market in Uniondale.

References

External links
Official Website

Film festivals in New York (state)